Austroholorchis is a genus of trematodes in the family Aephnidiogenidae.

Species
Austroholorchis levis Bray & Cribb, 1997
Austroholorchis procerus Bray, Cribb & Pichelin, 1999
Austroholorchis sprenti (Gibson, 1987) Bray & Cribb, 1997

References

Aephnidiogenidae
Trematode genera